Geumho Station is a station on the Seoul Subway Line 3 in Seongdong-gu, Seoul. The name of the station literally means "golden lake", although there is no lake to be found today in the neighborhood of this station. The short piece of road under which this station is built is situated between two consecutive road tunnels nearby.

Station layout

Vicinity
Exit 1 : Dusan APT, Geumho Park
Exit 2 : Geumho samgeori (3-way intersection)
Exit 3 : Geumok Elementary School
Exit 4 : Oksu Tunnel
Exit 5 : Geumho Tunnel

References 

Metro stations in Seongdong District
Seoul Metropolitan Subway stations
Seoul Subway Line 3
Railway stations in South Korea opened in 1985